William Herbert Hunt (born March 6, 1929) is an American oil billionaire, who along with his brothers Nelson Bunker Hunt and Lamar Hunt tried but failed to corner the world market in silver.
According to Forbes, as of January 2015 his net worth is estimated at $2.0 billion.

Early life
William Herbert Hunt was born in 1929 to Lyda Bunker and the oil well wildcatter H. L. Hunt.

Career
In the 1970s Hunt and his brother Nelson Bunker Hunt acquired 195 million ounces of silver, worth nearly $10 billion at the peak. When the price of silver collapsed 80% in 1980 the brothers lost their fortune in the silver trading scandal called Silver Thursday; together they lost a billion dollars. William Herbert Hunt went bankrupt in 1990, but was able to recover years later.

In 2012, Hunt sold a minor portion of Petro-Hunt's assets in the Williston Basin to Halcon Resources for $1.45 billion, lifting his net wealth to an estimated $3 billion.  Petro-Hunt continues to operate in the Williston Basin and across the US.

Personal life
Hunt lives in Dallas, Texas, and has five children.

References

Living people
American commodities traders
American billionaires
American businesspeople in metals
Hunt family
John Birch Society members
Texas Republicans
1929 births
20th-century American businesspeople
American businesspeople in the oil industry